Tamil Nadu Water Supply and Drainage Board (TWAD Board) is a public agency formed by the Government of Tamil Nadu, under the Ministry of Local Administration and Water Supply, assigned with the task of implementing all  water supply and sewerage schemes to the state of Tamil Nadu (except the Chennai Metropolitan Area).

TWAD Board coordinates with the Government of India's Ministry of Rural Development and Departments of Drinking Water Supply, Ministry of Water Resources, National River Conservation Directorate, Rajiv Gandhi National Drinking Water Mission, Central Ground Water Board, Non Government Organisations (NGOs), academic institutions, etc., to implement  the water supply and sewerage schemes in Tamilnadu.

History 
The local bodies were entrusted with the task of providing the amenities of water supply and drainage schemes initially. Then arose the necessity for an organisation of fully trained and experienced personnel on the Government side for the execution and maintenance of water supply and drainage schemes at satisfactory standards and minimum cost.

Hence the Sanitary Engineering Branch of the Madras Public Works Department was entrusted with the task of the investigation, design, execution and maintenance of the water supply and drainage schemes of all the local bodies in the state.

In the year 1962, the Sanitary Engineers circle and the Public Health Execution Circle were brought under the control of a separate Public Health Engineering and Municipal Works Department.

In the year 1966, the Public Health Engineering Department was reorganised on a territorial basis, with a view to cope with the increased work load and to ensure speedy execution of the schemes, when a number of water supply and drainage schemes were taken up.

Accordingly two Public Health Engineering circles were formed at Madras and Madurai, headed by separate Superintending Engineers, with exclusive jurisdiction to investigate, design, execute and maintain all urban water supply and drainage schemes.

The Government of Tamil Nadu constituted, the Tamilnadu Water Supply and Drainage (TWAD) Board as a non-statutory body during 1969. Statutory status was given to the Board with effect from 14.4.1971 by an enactment passed by the Tamil Nadu State Legislature.

Functions 
TWAD Board undertakes investigation, execution and maintenance of any scheme for the provision of watersupply and sewerage facilities, to meet the needs of any industries or institutions within the area of the local authority on the direction of state Government.

The watersupply and sewerage schemes undertaken by TWAD Board are handed over to the respective local bodies for maintenance on completion. However schemes of composite nature covering more than one local body are maintained by TWAD Board.

Funding Agencies 
Govt of India, under JnNURM, UIDSSMT AMRUT, IUDM
Govt of Tamil Nadu under Minimum Needs Programme
World Bank aided through TNUDP III
KfW (German Bank aid)
JICA (Japan aid).

Structure 
The headquarters at Chennai co-ordinates with all the regional offices and government agencies for effective implementation of various watersupply and sewerage projects through the following units :

Project Development Cell (PDC) 
Contract Management (CoM) Wing 
Project Management (PM) Wing 
Mega Project Monitoring wing
Operation & Management (O&M)
Research, Development , Training & PMC (RDT & PMC) Wing
Communication and Capacity Development (CCDU) Unit

Combined Water Supply Schemes (CWSS)

Sewerage schemes

See also 
Chennai MetroWater Supply and Sewage Board
Water supply and sanitation in India

References

External links
 Tamil Nadu Water Supply and Drainage Board website
 Tதமிழகத்தின் நீர் ஆதாரம் -பொறியாளர் ஆ. மோகனகிருஷ்ணன்

State agencies of Tamil Nadu
Water management authorities in India
Government agencies established in 1971
1971 establishments in Tamil Nadu